Chimney Rock is a prominent geological rock formation in Morrill County in western Nebraska. The formation served as a landmark along the Oregon Trail, the California Trail, and the Mormon Trail during the mid-19th century. The trails ran along the north side of the rock, which remains a visible landmark for modern travelers along U.S. Route 26 and Nebraska Highway 92. Chimney Rock National Historic Site was designated in 1956 and is an affiliated area of the National Park Service, operated by History Nebraska. Chimney Rock was added to the National Register of Historic Places on October 15, 1966.

History
Prior to exploration and settlement by European immigrants, the Native Americans of the areamainly the Lakota Siouxwould refer to this formation by a term which meant "elk penis". The first non-natives to see the pillar were probably the Astorians of Robert Stuart in their eastward journey from the Pacific Ocean in 1813. Chimney Rock was recorded in many journals after the Stuart expedition.

The name "Chimney Rock" probably originated from early fur traders. The first recorded mention of "Chimney Rock" was in 1827 by Joshua Pilcher. Pilcher had journeyed up the Platte River valley to the Salt Lake rendezvous of the Rocky Mountain fur trappers. The formation went through a variety of names before becoming Chimney Rock such as Chimley Rock and Chimney Tower, as well as euphemisms based on the original Native American name, such as Elk's Peak and Elk Brick.

A small town named Chimney Rock once stood near the base of the formation. A post office was established at the town of Chimney Rock in 1913, and remained in operation until 1922.

Based on sketches, paintings, written accounts, and the 1897 photograph by Darton, Chimney Rock was taller when it was first seen by settlers, but has since been reduced in height by erosion, lightning, and reportedly by cannon fire from the ground and from aircraft.

Geology
Chimney Rock consists primarily of Brule clay interlayered with volcanic ash and Arikaree sandstone. The harder sandstone layers near the top have protected the pillar since it broke away from the retreating cliff line to the south.

Today

Chimney Rock was designated a National Historic Site on August 9, 1956, and is a National Park Service affiliated area, maintained and administered by History Nebraska with NPS technical support. Chimney Rock and Independence Rock further west in Wyoming are two of the prominent features along the Oregon Trail. Chimney Rock is located 20 miles southeast of Scotts Bluff National Monument, on Nebraska Highway 92.

The Ethel and Christopher J. Abbot Visitor Center features museum exhibits and a video about pioneers and the migrations in the West, as well as a gift shop.

On March 1, 2006, the Nebraska State Quarter was released. The quarter features a covered wagon headed west past Chimney Rock, commemorating Nebraska's role in westward migration.

See also

Landmarks of the Nebraska Territory
Butte
Hoodoo
Courthouse and Jail Rocks
Nebraska Sandhills
Chimney Rock State Park, North Carolina

References

External links

 operated by the History Nebraska
Chimney Rock - National Park Service
 Chimney Rock National Historic Site. StateParks.com.

California Trail
Mormon Trail
Oregon Trail
Rock formations of Nebraska
History museums in Nebraska
Museums in Morrill County, Nebraska
Protected areas of Morrill County, Nebraska
Protected areas established in 1956
1956 establishments in Nebraska
Natural features on the National Register of Historic Places in Nebraska
National Register of Historic Places in Morrill County, Nebraska
Landforms of Morrill County, Nebraska
History Nebraska